Holley Trent is an American romance fiction author who writes with speculative fiction elements. Her books have queer characters and themes.

One of her novels has been described as "a polyamorous/triad romance about desert-dwelling telepathic descendants of Vikings." She is from North Carolina and writes work set there.

Her work was collected in Best Women's Erotica of the Year by Simon & Schuster in 2021.

References

Living people
American romantic fiction writers
Year of birth missing (living people)
American erotica writers
Writers from North Carolina
Place of birth missing (living people)
Women romantic fiction writers
21st-century American novelists
21st-century American women writers